Return to the Apocalyptic City is a live EP by American thrash metal band Testament, released in 1993. All tracks were recorded at the Hollywood Palladium, except for the last two; "Reign of Terror" was recorded during The New Order sessions in 1987–1988, but did not appear on that album; it did, however, surface as a B-side to the album's sole single "Trial by Fire". The closing track, "Return to Serenity", is a single edited version of the song, which appears on The Ritual.

Track listing
"Over the Wall" (Live) - 5:28
"So Many Lies" (Live) - 6:13
"The Haunting" (Live) - 4:28
"Disciples of the Watch" (Live) - 4:38
"Reign of Terror" - 4:48
"Return to Serenity" (Edit) - 4:30

Credits
Chuck Billy: vocals
Glen Alvelais: lead and rhythm guitars (tracks 1–4)
Alex Skolnick: lead and rhythm guitars (tracks 5–6)
Eric Peterson: rhythm guitar
Greg Christian: bass guitar
Paul Bostaph: drums (tracks 1–4)
Louie Clemente: drums (tracks 5–6)

References

1993 EPs
1993 live albums
Live EPs
Testament (band) EPs
Testament (band) live albums
Atlantic Records live albums
Atlantic Records EPs
Megaforce Records EPs